General Rensselaer may refer to:

Robert Van Rensselaer (1740–1802), New York Militia brigadier general in the American Revolutionary War
Stephen Van Rensselaer (1764–1839), New York Militia major general
Stephen Van Rensselaer IV (1789–1868), New York Militia major general